Barbra Joan Streisand is the thirteenth studio album by Barbra Streisand, released in August 1971 on Columbia Records. It was her second consecutive album produced by Richard Perry and features backing work by members of the female band Fanny. Like the two previous studio albums, the singer continued to opt for a more contemporary repertoire, this time choosing three songs by Carole King, two by John Lennon, two by Burt Bacharach and Hal David in medley form, and one each by Laura Nyro and the trio Michel LeGrand, Marilyn Bergman and Alan Bergman.

Three singles were released from the album, two of which had a moderate performance on the Billboard Hot 100 chart and were a hit on the Adult Contemporary chart. The album was well received by audiences and critics and went gold in the United States, Belgium and Sweden.

Production and release
In the late 1960s, Columbia Records began pressuring Barbra to record albums with more contemporary songs, as her albums until then consisted of big band songs, broadway musicals, and cabarets. The first attempt failed, and the 1969 album What About Today? became the first sales failure in the singer's career. Success would come with the follow-up album Stoney End, which sold over a million copies in the United States alone. With the next album, Barbra Joan Streisand, the singer continued to choose a more current repertoire. The album includes interpretations of many contemporary singer-songwriters of the day, including John Lennon, Laura Nyro, and three selections from Carole King's iconic 1971 album Tapestry. It also includes the first recording of "I Mean to Shine",  written by the then-unknown Steely Dan duo of Donald Fagen and Walter Becker (Steely Dan would not issue their first record until the following year).

Three singles were released to promote the album. The first one is from the music "Where You Lead", composed by Carole King and released in the US as a single in June 1971. It charted at number 40 on the Billboard Hot 100 and number 3 on the Adult Contemporary chart. "Mother" was released as the second single; it reached number 79 on the Billboard Hot 100 and number 24 on the AC Chart. The third and final single, "Space Captain", failed to chart.

Critical reception

The album received favorable reviews from music critics. William Ruhlmann from AllMusic website gave the album four and a half star out of five and wrote that although the singer "was not able to make the final transition into the pop/rock realm" thanks to the fact she doesn't compose her songs, she was as effective "making other people's songs her own". Billboard magazine wrote that the materia was "fine" and choose the songs "Where You Lead", "Love", "Space Captain" and "Beautiful" as the album's cuts. Stephen Holden from Rolling Stone magazine gave the album an unfavorable review and wrote that Streisand "invariably dramatizes and stylizes whatever she sings", he praised the songs "Since I Fell For You" and "The Summer Knows" but regarding to the Carole King and John Lennon songs she recorded, he wrote: "god, forbid". The Encyclopedia of Popular Music gave the album three out o five stars.

Commercial performance
The album reached #11 on the Billboard Pop Albums chart and was certified Gold by the RIAA. The album peaked #25 in Canada. It peaked #99 in the 1971's Year-end chart of the Cash Box magazine. According to the liner notes of Barbra's  retrospective box set: Just for the Record, the album also received a record certification in Belgium and in Sweden.

Track listing
Side one
 "Beautiful" (Carole King) – 2:15
 "Love" (John Lennon) – 3:06
 "Where You Lead" (Carole King, Toni Stern) – 2:58
 "I Never Meant to Hurt You" (Laura Nyro) – 3:51
 "Medley: One Less Bell to Answer/A House Is Not a Home" (Burt Bacharach, Hal David) – 6:33

Side two
 "Space Captain" (Matthew Moore) – 3:22
 "Since I Fell for You" (Buddy Johnson) – 3:27
 "Mother" (John Lennon) – 4:40
 "Theme from Summer of '42 (The Summer Knows)''" (Michel LeGrand, Marilyn Bergman, Alan Bergman) – 3:43
 "I Mean to Shine" (Donald Fagen, Walter Becker) – 2:55
 "You've Got a Friend" (Carole King) – 4:54

Charts

Certifications and sales

Personnel
Information is taken from the Barbra Archives

 Barbra Streisand – vocals (A1-A2, A4-A5, B2-B6, lead on A3, B1)
 June Millington (A3, B1), Mike Deasy (B3, electric on B6), Louie Shelton (A1) – guitar
 June Millington (B5-B6), Hugh McCracken (B5) – acoustic guitar
 John Uribe (B5) – lead guitar
 Eric Weissberg (B5) – additional guitar
 Nickey Barclay (A3, B1), Larry Muhoberac (A1, B6), Mike Rubini (B5), Lincoln Mayorga (A1), Nick De Caro (A2), Richard Perry (B3) – piano
 Donald Fagen (B5), Billy Preston (A3, B1-B2) – organ played by 
 Richard Perry (B3) - pipe organ 
 Jean Millington (A3, B1), John Osborn (B5), Joe Osborn (A1), Larry Knechtel (B3, B6) – bass guitar
 Alice DeBuhr (A3, B1, B5-B6), Jim Gordon (A1), Hal Blaine (A2), Jim Keltner (B3) – drums
 Alice DeBuhr (B1, B5), Richard Perry (B1) – percussion
 Richard Perry (A3) – tambourine 
 Bobby Keyes, Jim Price (B1, B5) – horns
 Gene Cipriano – clarinet solo, oboe solo (A2)
 Fanny (A3), Shirley Matthews (B1), Clydie King, Venetta Fields, Oma Drake (A3, B1) – background vocals
 Fanny (A3, B1), Dick Hazard (A4, B4), Gene Page (B2-B3, brass on B6), Kenny Welch (A5), Nick De Caro (A1-A2, strings on B5-B6), Richard Perry (B3), Head (B5-B6) – arrangements
 Dick Hazard (A4, B4), Gene Page (B2) – conductors
 Peter Matz (A5) – orchestration

Technical
 Bill Schnee, Sy Mitchell – remix engineers
 Bill Schnee, George Beauregard, Jack Andrews, John Fiore, Willie "The Kid" Greer – recording engineers
Ed Thrasher – photography

References

Barbra Streisand albums
1971 albums
Albums conducted by Richard Hazard
Albums conducted by Peter Matz
Albums arranged by Gene Page
Albums arranged by Richard Hazard
Albums produced by Richard Perry
Columbia Records albums